"Jogi" is a song remixed by British bhangra artist and DJ Panjabi MC. Some remix versions also credit Beenie Man. The original vocals were by Muhammad Sadiq (male vocals) and Ranjit Kaur (female vocals) in the release "Na Dil De Pardesi Nu".

"Jogi" also contains further sample from "It's a New Day" by Skull Snaps and "Put It On" by Big L feat. Kid Capri. The song was included in Panjabi MC's album The Album that also contained Panjabi MC's major hit "Mundian To Bach Ke".

Jogi EP
Panjabi MC released an EP also titled Jogi on 29 July 2003 with various mixes:
Panjabi MC & Beenie Man - "Jogi" - 3:53
Panjabi MC & Beenie Man - "Jogi (New York Mix)" - 3:43
Panjabi MC - "Jogi" - 3:12
Panjabi MC - "Jogi (Deichkind Short Mix)" - 3:49
Panjabi MC - "Jogi (Sleepwalker Mix)" 3:35
Panjabi MC - "Jogi (Deichkind Mix) - 4:55
Panjabi MC & Beenie Man - "Jogi (New York Instrumental Mix)" 3:36
Panjabi MC - "Jogi (Main Instrumental Mix)" - 3:55

Charts

Weekly charts

Year-end charts

Personnel
 Panjabi MC (Rajinder Rai) - production, samples, programming
Marcel Stepel - bass
Andre Dembkowski - guitars, keyboards, co-production
Mohammed Siddiq - vocals
Ranjit Kaur - vocals

In popular culture
The song has become subject of many covers, samples and remixes notably by Woofer in his release "Harie".

References

2003 songs
2003 singles
Panjabi MC songs
Heer Ranjha